
Adrienne Elizabeth McNeil Herndon was an actress, professor, and activist in Atlanta, Georgia. While admittedly an African American to friends and colleagues, she performed with the stage name Anne Du Bignon. She was one of the first African American faculty at Atlanta University, where she met W. E. B. Du Bois and subsequently worked with him. Herndon and Alonzo Herndon were an influential couple.

Biography
Adrienne Elizabeth McNeil was born on July 22, 1869, in Savannah, Georgia. She is described by historian Rebecca Burns as "short and lithe with a lively manner and sophisticated bearing" "[w]ith her creamy skin, wavy brown hair, and dark eyes, Adrienne moved easily [...] and kept her racial background a secret". She was about five feet tall.

McNeil was an 1890 graduate of Atlanta University's Normal Department, and attended the Boston School of Dramatic Arts (1902-3) and New York City's American Academy of Dramatic Arts. For her final project she performed Anthony and Cleopatra under the stage name Anne Du Bignon, claiming she was French-Creole.

At Atlanta University Herndon became "the first director of dramatics and teacher of elocution" from 1895, until her death in 1910. She was one of the first two African American faculty at Atlanta University (the other was George Towns), two years prior to Du Bois. There she organised fundraising and an annual Shakespeare play for the senior class.

In January 1904, Herndon made her debut with a solo-performed at Steinert Hall in Boston again using the name Anne Du Bignon. She also sang at recitals.

Herndon supported black suffrage. Du Bois and Adrienne Herndon were colleagues at Atlanta university. In October 1904, Alonzo signed the Ontario Conference led by Du Bois. Adrienne Herndon, in 1905, hosted the "Niagara Movement" organized by Du Bois. She participated in Du Bois's Wheat Street Baptist Church demonstration on November 30, 1905, for the "southern movement" by joining him on the platform. During the Atlanta Riots two of Alonzo's employees were attacked and killed. The Tuesday morning after the rioting, Herndon  along with Reverend Henry H. Proctor met with the city mayor and chief of police to discuss safety for victims and justice for the rioters.

Adrienne McNeil married Alonzo Herndon in 1894. Before she agreed to marry him, he had to promise to support her theater career. In 1897 Adrienne and Alonzo Herndon had a son, Norris Bumstead Herndon.

The Herndon Home, she designed without plans but worked closely with a team of black craftsmen. Unfortunately Adrienne died of Addison's disease just when the home that she had designed to be their "first real home" was nearing completion, on April 6, 1910.

Norris Herndon, a 1919 graduate of Atlanta University, developed his father's insurance company from $1 million to $54 million in assets. In 1947 Norris Herndon established the Herndon Foundation which maintains the Herndon Home. He transformed the house into a museum in 1973.  It was declared a U.S. National Historic Landmark in 2000.

Notes

Sources

Further reading
 
Clarence Albert Bacote, The story of Atlanta University: a century of service, 1865-1965, Atlanta University, 1969.

1869 births
1910 deaths
African-American actresses
Actresses from Atlanta
American stage actresses
19th-century American actresses
Actors from Savannah, Georgia
Clark Atlanta University alumni
American Academy of Dramatic Arts alumni
Clark Atlanta University faculty
Burials at South-View Cemetery
American women academics
20th-century African-American people
20th-century African-American women